The Overland Automobile Company was an American automobile manufacturer in Toledo, Ohio. It was the founding company of Willys-Overland and one of the earliest mass producers of automobiles.

History
The Overland Automobile department was founded in Terre Haute, Indiana by Claude E. Cox, when Charles Minshall of Standard Wheel Company decided to expand into automobile manufacturing. Standard Wheel were major suppliers of wheels to the carriage industry. Cox, a recent graduate of Rose Polytechnic Institute, developed a gasoline runabout in 1903.

Cox's runabout was an advanced design with a water-cooled 5-hp vertical single-cylinder engine mounted up front under a hood, rather than under the seat which was common practice. It featured a jump-spark ignition and a two-speed planetary transmission operated by a foot pedal. Priced at $595, 11 were built in 1903 doubling to 23 in 1904 when a two-cylinder engine was introduced. Claude Cox continued development adding a 16-hp four-cylinder engine, shaft-drive instead of chain and a steering wheel instead of a tiller, by 1905. 

In 1905, Standard Wheel moved Overland production to Indianapolis, Indiana, but decided to leave automobile production and sold Overland to Claude Cox for $8,000, .  David M. Parry became a 51% investor and formed the Overland Auto Company.  Overland production was now in an extension of Parry's buggy factory. Now producing two models, production was only 37 cars in 1905 because of the moves and in 1906 production increased to 47, all sold to John North Willys, a car dealer in Elmira, New York. 

The 1907 Panic caused David Parry to go bankrupt, including the loss of his house. By 1910 he had recovered enough to start the Parry Auto Company. J. N. Willys arrived in Indianapolis to protect his investment and ended up taking over Overland Auto Company.

In 1908, control of Overland was purchased by J. N. Willys and he managed to increase production that year to 467 Overlands. Overlands were rationalized to one design of a 24hp four-cylinder car on two different wheelbases selling for $1,295, . In 1909 the production soared to 4,907 Overlands and Claude Cox left for Inter-State and later to form his own laboratory business (now Testek, Inc.) in Detroit.   In 1909, the Pope-Toledo factory was purchased and Overland moved to Toledo.

Production continued to grow and Overland remained a top three U. S. automobile manufacturer through 1919. In 1912, it was renamed Willys-Overland Company. Overland models expanded in the mid-price automobile market until 1917 when a new $500 Overland to challenge the Model T Ford was announced. A disastrous strike delayed introduction until 1919 when it was priced at $845 with electric lights and a self-starter. Willys revised this car to the Blue Bird and Red Bird models which helped Willys-Overland return to strength following a Receivership.  Willys-Overland continued to use the Overland marque until 1926 when it became the Overland Whippet and then Willys Whippet.

Models

Media
One of the more unusual uses of an Overland was in 1911 when Milton Reeves used a 1910 model to create his 8-wheel Octo-Auto, his eight-wheel car.

The last vestige of the Overland automobile empire remains in the form of bricks spelling out "Overland" in the smoke stack at the Toledo factory that once formed the core of Willys automotive empire. But the name would come back when DaimlerChrysler (Now Fiat Chrysler Automobiles) introduced the Overland name for a trim package on the 2002–present (except 2005 model year) Jeep Grand Cherokee. The badging is a recreation of the Overland nameplate from the early twentieth century.

References

External links

 History of Overland from Willys-Overland-Knight Registry
 Photographs of Overland automobiles from Willys-Overland-Knight Registry
 Overland Automobiles at ConceptCarz
 Overland at Manitoba Auto Museum
 
 Hemmings Feature Article - Claude E. Cox

Chrysler
American Motors
Jeep
Defunct motor vehicle manufacturers of the United States
Motor vehicle manufacturers based in Indiana
Motor vehicle manufacturers based in Ohio
Defunct companies based in Indiana
Veteran vehicles
Brass Era vehicles
Vintage vehicles
1900s cars
1910s cars
1920s cars